The Karachi Gymkhana (KG) (Urdu: کراچی جِمخانہ) is a premier gymkhana (sports club) in the city of Karachi. It is located on Club Road in Karachi, Sindh, Pakistan. 

Formerly, it was a first class cricket ground and it hosted first-class matches between 1926-27 and 1986-87.

History

The club was founded in 1886. It is one of the oldest gymkhanas in Pakistan.

Facilities
The KG Club provides various sports and games facilities for its members. The club has a main building with a restaurant, snooker room, cricket ground, swimming pool, tennis, squash courts, badminton, table tennis, bridge room, gym and weight training facility.  Most sports activities have coaches for newcomers. One has to pay for coaching services and membership is necessary to enroll in coaching courses. 

Every year there is an annual sports festival in which members and their children take part in various sports events on the cricket ground. There are regular tournaments for squash, swimming, cricket, table tennis and tennis. 

There are three types of swimming pools. One is the main pool for experienced swimmers, and there is one for learners.

See also
 Hindu Gymkhana, Karachi

References

External links
Karachi Gymkhana Ground, Karachi at CricketArchive

Sports clubs in Pakistan
Sports venues in Karachi
Multi-sport clubs in Pakistan
Cricket grounds in Pakistan
Swimming venues in Pakistan
Tennis venues in Pakistan
1886 establishments in British India
Gentlemen's clubs in Pakistan